William Gay Thrash (September 17, 1916 – July 4, 2011) was a United States Marine Corps three-star general and highly decorated Naval Aviator.  He retired from active duty on June 30, 1972, after more than 30 years of distinguished service.

Thrash earned the Silver Star and the Legion of Merit during the Korean War, and a Gold Star in lieu of a second Legion of Merit for exceptionally meritorious conduct as senior United Nations officer in a Chinese Communist prisoner of war camp.

Biography

Early years
William Gay Thrash was born in Tifton, Georgia, on September 17, 1916, to Jesse Thrash and Leila Gay. He graduated from Boys' High School in Atlanta, Georgia, in 1934.  He earned a Bachelor of Science degree from the Georgia School of Technology in 1939. During his senior year, he was a member of Georgia Tech's famed football squad, the Yellow Jackets.

Thrash was commissioned a second lieutenant in the Marine Corps on July 14, 1939. He was assigned to the Basic School at the Philadelphia Navy Yard until June 1940, when he was transferred to Camp Elliott in California.  He remained at Camp Elliott serving in various assignments as an engineering officer until transferred to Naval Air Station Pensacola, Florida in September 1941 for flight training.

World War II
Promoted to first lieutenant in January 1942, Thrash received his wings as a Naval Aviator on March 18 of the same year. He was promoted to captain that May, then remained at Pensacola until September 1942 as an instructor. Thrash joined the 1st Marine Aircraft Wing in October and was deployed overseas with the wing in November. While overseas, he was promoted to major in April 1943. Between June and September 1943, he flew more than 100 combat reconnaissance missions over enemy territory in the Gilbert-Solomon islands area, earning the Distinguished Flying Cross and five Air Medals.  Returning to the United States in January 1944, he was assigned to Marine Fleet Air, West Coast, until June 1945 when he was promoted to lieutenant colonel. Following another tour of overseas duty, where he saw service at Pearl Harbor, Saipan, and Okinawa, he was assigned to the Division of Aviation at Headquarters Marine Corps in January 1946. That October, he began a two-year assignment in the Office of the Chief of Naval Operations in Washington, D.C.

In August 1948, he entered the Naval War College at Newport, Rhode Island. Upon graduation from its logistics course in May 1949, he was assigned as an instructor in the Aviation Section, Marine Corps Schools, Quantico, Virginia.

1950s
Transferred to the 1st Marine Aircraft Wing in June 1951, Lieutenant Colonel Thrash earned the Silver Star for gallantry in action, October 25, 1951, as Tactical Officer and pilot of a plane in Marine Aircraft Group 12.  Encountering 24 hostile jets while leading his flight of 11 Corsairs on a strike against a strategic enemy supply point, he led his flight in an aggressive attack, forcing the enemy planes to break off the engagement and retire. On reaching the target area, he succeeded in scoring direct hits, inflicting serious damage on the enemy.

While serving as tactical officer of Marine Aircraft Group 12, Thrash was engaged in a reconnaissance flight over enemy anti-aircraft positions in Korea on December 21, 1951. When his plane was struck by enemy fire, he parachuted after radioing his base that he was bailing out.  Taken prisoner after landing in the heavily fortified enemy area, he remained a prisoner for almost two years.

Thrash was awarded his first Legion of Merit with Combat "V" and his sixth and seventh Air Medals prior to being captured and imprisoned by the Chinese Communists in December 1951.  Following his repatriation in September 1953, he returned to the United States and was subsequently assigned as executive officer, and later, commander of Marine Wing Service Group 37.  From May 1955 to July 1958, he was attached to the Division of Aviation, Headquarters Marine Corps, serving consecutively as assistant head, and head, Plans and Readiness Branch, and deputy assistant director of aviation.  While there, he was promoted to colonel in November 1955. In June 1959, he completed the National War College in  Washington, D.C.

In July 1959, Colonel Thrash reported to the Marine Corps Air Station Kaneohe Bay, Hawaii, as commanding officer of Marine Aircraft Group 13. During this assignment, he led a trans-Pacific flight of Marine light attack jet aircraft in a record-making first flight from Kaneohe Bay, Hawaii, to Naval Air Station Alameda, California.

1960s

In August 1960, he was named chief of staff of the 1st Marine Brigade at Kaneohe. He served in this capacity until May 1962, when he was deployed to Thailand as chief of staff of the 3rd Marine Expeditionary Unit. He returned from Thailand in August 1962 and assumed duty as chief of staff of the 1st Marine Aircraft Wing, Aircraft, FMF, Pacific, Iwakuni, Japan. The following June, he arrived in the United States, and assumed duty at Norfolk, Virginia, as assistant chief of staff, G-3, Fleet Marine Force, Atlantic.

In March 1964, he was promoted to brigadier general and assigned as legislative assistant to the Commandant of the Marine Corps, and was awarded the Navy Commendation Medal for service during this assignment. Following his promotion to major general on January 19, 1967, he assumed duties the following month as commander, Marine Corps Air Bases, Western Area/Commanding General, Marine Corps Air Station El Toro, California and earned his third Legion of Merit.

Vietnam War
Major General Thrash was ordered to the Republic of Vietnam in July 1969, for a one-year tour of duty as commanding general, 1st Marine Aircraft Wing in the I Corps Tactical Zone, and earned the Distinguished Service Medal for his outstanding performance of duty during this tour.

1970s
Upon his return to the United States in July 1970, he reported to the Marine Corps Base, Quantico, for duty as deputy for education/director, Education Center, Marine Corps Development and Education Command.  MajGen Thrash was nominated for promotion to three-star rank, and his nomination was approved by President Richard Nixon in February 1971.  On March 12, 1971, his promotion was confirmed by the U.S. Senate, and he received his third star upon assignment as commanding general, Marine Corps Development and Education Command at Quantico. He served in this capacity until he retired from active duty on June 30, 1972.  For exceptionally meritorious service during his last tour of duty while stationed at Quantico, he was awarded a Gold Star in lieu of a second Distinguished Service Medal.

Later years and death
LtGen Thrash and his wife, the former Virginia Merryman of Atlanta, Georgia, had two sons, William Gay Jr., and Ralph Merryman Thrash, both Marine Corps officers.  LtGen and Mrs. Thrash resided in Newport Beach, California, then later in Hilton Head, South Carolina. He was also active in the Marine Corps Oral History Program and received a Certificate of Appreciation from the Commandant of the Marine Corps, Paul X. Kelley in June 1986.

Thrash died on July 4, 2011, at the Hilton Head Hospital in Hilton Head Island, South Carolina.

Awards and medals

Notes

References

External links
 

1916 births
2011 deaths
People from Tifton, Georgia
Military personnel from Georgia (U.S. state)
Aviators from Georgia (U.S. state)
United States Marine Corps generals
United States Naval Aviators
American prisoners of war in the Korean War
United States Marine Corps personnel of the Korean War
United States Marine Corps personnel of the Vietnam War
United States Marine Corps pilots of World War II
American Korean War pilots
Shot-down aviators
Recipients of the Navy Distinguished Service Medal
Recipients of the Silver Star
Recipients of the Legion of Merit
Recipients of the Distinguished Flying Cross (United States)
Recipients of the Air Medal
Georgia Tech alumni
Georgia Tech Yellow Jackets football players
Burials at Beaufort National Cemetery